The Bishop of Newcastle is the diocesan bishop of the Anglican Diocese of Newcastle, Australia.

List of Bishops of Newcastle
References

External links

 – official site

 
Lists of Anglican bishops and archbishops
Anglican bishops of Newcastle